The 1957 Norwegian Football Cup was the 52nd season of the Norwegian annual knockout football tournament. The tournament was open for all members of NFF, except those from Northern Norway. The final was played at Ullevaal Stadion in Oslo on 20 October 1957, and was contested by the six-times winners Fredrikstad, and Sandefjord BK who made their debut in the Norwegian Cup final.

Fredrikstad won their seventh title with a 4–0 win in the final, which also secured the double for Fredrikstad, as they also won the 1956–57 Norwegian Main League. This was Fredrikstad's second double, they won the first in 1938. Skeid was the defending champions, but lost 3–0 against Sarpsborg in the quarterfinal and was eliminated.

First round

|-
|colspan="3" style="background-color:#97DEFF"|Replay

|-
|colspan="3" style="background-color:#97DEFF"|2nd replay

|}

Second round

|-
|colspan="3" style="background-color:#97DEFF"|Replay

|}

Third round

|colspan="3" style="background-color:#97DEFF"|4 August 1957

|-
|colspan="3" style="background-color:#97DEFF"|Replay: 7 August 1957

|}

Fourth round

|colspan="3" style="background-color:#97DEFF"|18 August 1957

|}

Quarter-finals

|colspan="3" style="background-color:#97DEFF"|8 September 1957

|}

Semi-finals

|colspan="3" style="background-color:#97DEFF"|6 October 1957

|}

Final

See also
1956–57 Norwegian Main League
1957 in Norwegian football

References

Norwegian Football Cup seasons
Norway
Cup